Love Scenery is a 2021 Chinese television series directed by Qin Zhen, adapted from the novel "A bright spear is easy to hide, but a secret love is hard to prevent" by Qiao Yao. It starred Lin Yi and Xu Lu in the leading roles.

Cast

Main
Lin Yi as Lu Jing
Xu Lu as Liang Chen

Supporting
Hu Bing as Ding Jiayun 
Hu Yunhao as Sun Binyu
Chong Dan Ni as Ma Shanshan
Wang Ting as Liu Yiqing, Liang Chen's manager
Jiang Yu Wei as Yuan Keke, Liang Chen's assistant
Wang Cheng as Zhou Dan, Lu Jing's roommate
Wang Rong as Liu Er, Lu Jing's roommate
Zhong Zheng as He Ye, Lu Jing's roommate
Fu Wei Lun as Gu Feiming, Lu Jing's classmate
Wang Lu Qing as Qi Qi, Lu Jing's classmate
Li Chang as Zhu Guang, Jiayun's assistant
Yue Yao Li as Lu Jing's grandfather 
Xue Shu Jie as Lu Jing's grandmother
Liu Guan Lin as He Jia
Wang Si Jie as Xiao Yuke
Shang Si Qi as Xiao Guo, Ma Shanshan's assistant
Zhou Cheng Ao as Lin Qi, Ma Shanshan's ex boyfriend
Du Yu Chen as Meng Lanzhi

Others
Wang Wei Hua as Lu Jing's father
Yu Xiao Lei as Lu Jing's mother
Wang Xin as Liang Chen's father
Tian Miao as Liang Chen's mother
Jing Yan Jun as Lu Xiangchen, Lu Jing's cousin
Dai Chao as Yue Yuxun, Liang Chen's ex boyfriend
Wang Zhi Min as Ma Minghui
Li Ya Nan as CEO Lin
Guan Jin Lin as Zhou Xiaohuan
Zhou Wen Tao as Shang Zhi
Zhu La La as Liu Shun
Kang Qi Xuan as Xiao Pang
Wang Xiao Yu as A Jie

References

External links

2020s Chinese television series debuts
2021 Chinese television series debuts
Chinese romantic comedy television series
Television shows based on Chinese novels
Chinese novels adapted into television series
Television series by Tencent Penguin Pictures